This is a list of the squads that qualified for the 2014 Indian Premier League.

Note: Players with international caps are listed in bold.

Chennai Super Kings 

Source:

Delhi Daredevils

Kings XI Punjab

Kolkata Knight Riders

Mumbai Indians

Rajasthan Royals

Royal Challengers Bangalore

Sunrisers Hyderabad

References

2014 Indian Premier League